The 2016 Wimbledon Championships was a Grand Slam tennis tournament which took place at All England Lawn Tennis and Croquet Club in Wimbledon, London, United Kingdom. The main draw commenced on 27 June 2016 and concluded on 10 July 2016.

2016 was the 130th edition of Wimbledon, the 49th in the Open Era and the third Grand Slam tournament of the year. It was played on grass courts and was part of the ATP World Tour, the WTA Tour, the ITF Junior tour and the NEC Tour. The tournament was organised by All England Lawn Tennis Club and International Tennis Federation.

For the first time in the Championships' history, singles events were held in the wheelchair competitions. Thus, all four majors now hold wheelchair singles events, making a complete Grand Slam in the discipline possible.

Novak Djokovic was the two-time defending champion in the gentlemen's singles, but lost in the third round to Sam Querrey, ending a 30-match winning streak at the majors and Djokovic's hopes of becoming the first man to achieve the Golden Slam. The gentlemen's singles title was won by Andy Murray. Serena Williams successfully defended her ladies' singles title and equaled Steffi Graf's Open Era record of 22 major singles titles.

The gentlemen's doubles event consisted of 'best of three sets' matches for rounds 1 and 2 in order to help with 'catch-up' scheduling due to a rain-stricken first week. It was also the first time since 2004 that play took place on Middle Sunday, also known as the People's Sunday, due to the fact that no tickets are sold in advance or through the ballot and all seats are made available on general sale the day before.

Tournament 

The 2016 Wimbledon Championships was the 130th edition of the tournament and was held at the All England Lawn Tennis and Croquet Club in London.

The tournament was run by the International Tennis Federation (ITF) and was included in the 2016 ATP World Tour and the 2016 WTA Tour calendars under the Grand Slam category. The tournament consisted of men's (singles and doubles), women's (singles and doubles), mixed doubles, boys (under 18 – singles and doubles) and girls (under 18 – singles and doubles), which is also a part of the Grade A category of tournaments for under 18, doubles events for men's and women's wheelchair tennis players as part of the UNIQLO Tour under the Grand Slam category and, for the first time in the tournament history this year, men's and women's singles events for wheelchair tennis players. The tournament was played only on grass courts; main draw matches were played at the  All England Lawn Tennis and Croquet Club, Wimbledon; qualifying matches were played at the Bank of England Sports Ground, Roehampton.

Point and prize money distribution

Point distribution 
Below is the tables with the point distribution for each phase of the tournament.

Senior points

Wheelchair points

Junior points

Prize money 

The total prize money for this year tournament is of £28.10m, an increase of 5% from last year tournament. The players who will win the men's singles and women's singles will earn £2.00m, an increase of £120,000 from the previous year. The prize money for men's doubles, women's doubles and wheelchair players were also increased for this year competition.

* per team

Singles players 
Gentlemen's singles

Ladies' singles

Day-by-day summaries

Singles seeds 

The seeds for the 2016 Wimbledon Championships were announced on Wednesday, 22 June 2016.

Gentlemen's singles 
The seeds for gentlemen's singles are adjusted on a surface-based system to reflect more accurately the individual player's grass court achievement as per the following formula, which applies to the top 32 players according to the ATP rankings on 20 June 2016:
 Take Entry System Position points at 20 June 2016.
 Add 100% points earned for all grass court tournaments in the past 12 months (22 June 2015 – 19 June 2016).
 Add 75% points earned for best grass court tournament in the 12 months before that (16 June 2014 – 21 June 2015).

Rank and points before are as of 27 June 2016.

Withdrawn players

Ladies' singles 
The seeds for ladies' singles are based on the WTA rankings as of 20 June 2016. Rank and points before are as of 27 June 2016.

Withdrawn players

Doubles seeds

Gentlemen's doubles 

1 Rankings are as of 20 June 2016.

Ladies' doubles 

1 Rankings are as of 20 June 2016.

Mixed doubles 

1 Rankings are as of 27 June 2016.

Main draw wild card entries
The following players were given wild cards into the main draw senior events, based on internal selection and recent performances.

Gentlemen's singles 
  Liam Broady
  Dustin Brown
  Brydan Klein
  Radek Štěpánek
  Alexander Ward
  James Ward

Ladies' singles 
  Daniela Hantuchová
  Marina Melnikova
  Tara Moore
  Laura Robson
  Evgeniya Rodina
  Katie Swan

Gentlemen's doubles 
 Kyle Edmund /  James Ward
 Daniel Evans  /  Lloyd Glasspool
 Lleyton Hewitt /  Jordan Thompson
 Brydan Klein /  Alexander Ward
 Jonathan Marray  /  Adil Shamasdin
 Ken Skupski  /  Neal Skupski

Ladies' doubles 
 Ashleigh Barty  /  Laura Robson
 Daniela Hantuchová /  Donna Vekić
 Tara Moore  /  Conny Perrin
 Jocelyn Rae  /  Anna Smith

Mixed doubles 
 Liam Broady /  Naomi Broady
 Colin Fleming  /  Jocelyn Rae
 Dominic Inglot /  Laura Robson
 Ken Skupski  /  Tara Moore
 Neal Skupski  /  Anna Smith

Main draw qualifiers

Gentlemen's singles

Men's singles qualifiers
  Matthew Barton
  Alexander Kudryavtsev
  Tristan Lamasine
  Marcus Willis
  Ruben Bemelmans
  Bjorn Fratangelo
  Luke Saville
  Marius Copil
  Igor Sijsling
  Albano Olivetti
  Lukáš Lacko
  Yoshihito Nishioka
  Franko Škugor
  Dennis Novikov
  Radu Albot
  Édouard Roger-Vasselin

Ladies' singles 

Women's singles qualifiers
  Tatjana Maria
  Amra Sadiković
  Jana Čepelová
  Aleksandra Krunić
  Maria Sakkari
  Julia Boserup
  Tamira Paszek
  Luksika Kumkhum
  Mandy Minella
  Ekaterina Alexandrova
  Marina Erakovic
  Paula Kania

Lucky losers
  Duan Yingying

Gentlemen's doubles 

Men's doubles qualifiers
  Quentin Halys /  Tristan Lamasine
  Konstantin Kravchuk /  Denys Molchanov
  Marcelo Arévalo /  Roberto Maytín
  Dustin Brown /  Jan-Lennard Struff

Lucky losers
  Sanchai Ratiwatana /  Sonchat Ratiwatana

Ladies' doubles 

Women's doubles qualifiers
  Demi Schuurs /  Renata Voráčová
  Elise Mertens /  An-Sophie Mestach
  Chan Chin-wei /  Han Xinyun
  Shuko Aoyama /  Makoto Ninomiya

Protected ranking
The following players were accepted directly into the main draw using a protected ranking:

 Men's singles
  Brian Baker (PR 56)
  Julien Benneteau (PR 39)
  Juan Martín del Potro (PR 7)
  Lu Yen-hsun (PR 77)
  Florian Mayer (PR 34)
  Janko Tipsarević (PR 39)
  Dmitry Tursunov (PR 89)

 Women's singles
  Victoria Duval (PR 92)
  Peng Shuai (PR 27)

Champions

Seniors

Gentlemen's singles 

    Andy Murray def.  Milos Raonic, 6–4, 7–6(7–3), 7–6(7–2)

Ladies' singles 

  Serena Williams  def.  Angelique Kerber, 7–5, 6–3

Gentlemen's doubles 

  Pierre-Hugues Herbert /  Nicolas Mahut def.  Julien Benneteau /  Édouard Roger-Vasselin, 6–4, 7–6(7–1), 6–3

Ladies' doubles 

  Serena Williams /  Venus Williams def.  Tímea Babos  /  Yaroslava Shvedova, 6–3, 6–4

Mixed doubles 

  Henri Kontinen /  Heather Watson def.  Robert Farah /  Anna-Lena Grönefeld  7–6(7–5), 6–4

Juniors

Boys' singles 

  Denis Shapovalov def.  Alex De Minaur, 4–6, 6–1, 6–3

Girls' singles 

  Anastasia Potapova def.  Dayana Yastremska, 6–4, 6–3

Boys' doubles 

  Kenneth Raisma /  Stefanos Tsitsipas def.  Félix Auger-Aliassime /  Denis Shapovalov, 4–6, 6–4, 6–2

Girls' doubles 

  Usue Maitane Arconada /  Claire Liu def.  Mariam Bolkvadze /  Caty McNally, 6–2, 6–3

Invitation

Gentlemen's invitation doubles 

  Greg Rusedski /  Fabrice Santoro def.  Jonas Björkman /  Thomas Johansson, 7–5, 6–1

Ladies' invitation doubles 

  Martina Navratilova /  Selima Sfar def.  Lindsay Davenport /  Mary Joe Fernández, 7–6(7–5), 0–0r

Senior gentlemen's invitation doubles 

  Todd Woodbridge /  Mark Woodforde def.  Jacco Eltingh /  Paul Haarhuis, 6–2, 7–5

Wheelchair events

Wheelchair gentlemen's singles 

  Gordon Reid def.  Stefan Olsson, 6–1, 6–4

Wheelchair ladies' singles 

  Jiske Griffioen def.  Aniek van Koot, 4–6, 6–0, 6–4

Wheelchair gentlemen's doubles 

  Alfie Hewett /  Gordon Reid def.  Stéphane Houdet /  Nicolas Peifer, 4–6, 6–1, 7–6(8–6)

Wheelchair ladies' doubles 

  Yui Kamiji /  Jordanne Whiley def.  Jiske Griffioen /  Aniek van Koot, 6–2, 6–2

Withdrawals 
The following players were accepted directly into the main tournament, but withdrew with injuries, suspensions or personal reasons.
Before the tournament

 Men's singles
  Thanasi Kokkinakis → replaced by  Gastão Elias
  Rafael Nadal → replaced by  Facundo Bagnis
  Tommy Robredo → replaced by  Albert Montañés

 Women's singles
  Victoria Azarenka → replaced by  Duan Yingying
  Naomi Osaka → replaced by  Anna Tatishvili
  Flavia Pennetta → replaced by  Shelby Rogers
  Maria Sharapova → replaced by  Kateřina Siniaková

During the tournament
Men's singles
  Mikhail Kukushkin

Retirements 

 Men's singles
  Richard Gasquet
  Kei Nishikori

 Women's singles
  Belinda Bencic
  Margarita Gasparyan
  Anna Tatishvili

References

External links